Adam Kieft (born August 21, 1982) is a former American football offensive lineman for the Cincinnati Bengals of the National Football League (NFL). Kieft attended Rockford High School in Rockford, Michigan. He was selected with the 17th pick of the fifth round (153rd overall) of the 2005 NFL Draft out of Central Michigan University. He was redshirted his freshman year of college due to a broken foot and started the following four years as an offensive tackle for the Chippewas. He stands 6'7" tall and weighs 337 lbs.

Kieft sat out his first two seasons in Cincinnati due to a knee injury (torn ACL/MCL in rookie mock game).  He signed a 3-year contract with the Bengals after being drafted in 2005. On August 28, 2007, Kieft was placed on the reserve/injured list.  On February 28, 2008, the Bengals did not tender an offer to Kieft, making him a free agent.

References 

1982 births
American football offensive tackles
Central Michigan Chippewas football players
Cincinnati Bengals players
Living people
People from Rockford, Michigan